Pierre Bourgeois (4 December 1898 – 25 May 1976) was a Belgian poet. He was born in Charleroi and was the brother of the architect Victor Bourgeois. In his own words, he was a poet for the whole of his life: he published around 800 poems, and hundreds of pages are still unpublished (including a journal of 35 volumes).

External links
 The Bourgeois brothers

Belgian male poets
20th-century Belgian poets
20th-century Belgian male writers
1898 births
1976 deaths
Writers from Charleroi